William C. Lansdon (May 6, 1863 – August 28, 1940) was a judge of the United States Board of Tax Appeals (later the United States Tax Court) from 1924 to 1934.

Born in Linn County, Kansas, Lansdon resided in his early years in Salina, Kansas. He served as an executive officer of the Kansas State Farmers Union, of which he was the vice president from 1921 to 1925. He also worked as a newspaperman and as a member of the faculty of the University of Kansas. Landson was the Democratic Party nominee for Governor of Kansas in the 1916 Kansas gubernatorial election, losing to incumbent Arthur Capper by nearly a two-thirds margin. Lansdon fared no better running against Henry Justin Allen in the 1918 Kansas gubernatorial election.

Republican Senator Charles Curtis championed Lansdon's appointment to the Board of Tax Appeals. He was one of the original twelve members appointed to the Board, and one of a group of seven appointed "from the public" rather than from positions in the federal government.

In retirement, Lansdon moved to a farm in Laytonville, Arkansas, where he died about five years later at the age of 77.

References

1863 births
1940 deaths
People from Linn County, Kansas
Members of the United States Board of Tax Appeals
United States Article I federal judges appointed by Calvin Coolidge
Kansas Democrats